KREF (1400 AM) is a radio station broadcasting a sports format. Licensed to Norman, Oklahoma, United States, the station serves the Oklahoma City area.  The station is currently owned by Metro Radio Group, LLC, and carries programming from Fox Sports Radio, Premiere Radio Networks and Westwood One. In addition, KREF is an affiliate of the Cleveland Browns Radio Network.

FM Translator
KREF is also broadcast on the following FM translator:

Programming
On weekday's, T Row in the Morning with Toby Rowland and TJ Perry is on from 6-9am. The Plank Show with Chris Plank is on from 9-11am. Total Sports with James Hale is on from 11am-2pm. The Rush with Chad McKee and Teddy Lehman is on from 2-6pm. Fox Sports Radio is on overnights and weekends.

References

External links
KREF Website

REF
Sports radio stations in the United States
Radio stations established in 1949